Solenopsis texana, the thief ant  (one of several species known by this name), is a species of ant in the family Formicidae.

Subspecies
These two subspecies belong to the species Solenopsis texana:
 Solenopsis texana catalinae Wheeler, 1904 i c g
 Solenopsis texana texana Emery, 1895 i c g
Data sources: i = ITIS, c = Catalogue of Life, g = GBIF, b = Bugguide.net

References

Further reading

 

texana
Articles created by Qbugbot
Insects described in 1895